McGaw is an unincorporated community in Scioto County, in the U.S. state of Ohio.

History
A post office called McGaw was established in 1893, and remained in operation until 1919. Besides the post office, McGaw had a church and country store.

References

Unincorporated communities in Scioto County, Ohio
Unincorporated communities in Ohio